Siege of Syracuse may refer to:

Sieges 
By the Athenians:
 Siege of Syracuse (415–413 BC), during the Sicilian Expedition
By, or in league with, the Carthaginians:
 Siege of Syracuse (397 BC)
 Siege of Syracuse (343 BC)
 Siege of Syracuse (311–309 BC)
 Siege of Syracuse (278 BC)
By the Roman Republic:
 Siege of Syracuse (213–212 BC), during the Second Punic War against Carthage
By the Arab Aghlabid dynasty:
 Siege of Syracuse (827–828)
 Siege of Syracuse (868)
 Siege of Syracuse (877–878)

Other 
 Siege of Syracuse (film),  a 1960 historical drama film

See also 
 List of sieges of Syracuse